The Rural Municipality of Bratt's Lake No. 129 is a rural municipality (RM) in the Canadian province of Saskatchewan within Census Division No. 6 and  Division No. 2.

History 
The RM of Bratt's Lake No. 129 incorporated as a rural municipality on January 1, 1913.

Geography

Communities and localities 
The following communities are located within the RM.

 Corinne
 Diana
 Estlin
 Wilcox

Demographics 

Government 
The RM of Bratt's Lake No. 129 is governed by an elected municipal council and an appointed administrator that meets on the second Tuesday of every month. The reeve of the RM is J. Barry Hamdorf while its administrator is Linda Klimm. The RM's office is located in Wilcox.

References 

B

Division No. 6, Saskatchewan